The Psion netBook is a small subnotebook computer developed by Psion. Released in 1999, it was for the mobile enterprise market.

Description
Similar in design to the later, consumer-oriented Psion Series 7, the netBook has a clamshell design, a Video Graphics Array (VGA) resolution touch-sensitive colour screen, 32 MB random-access memory (RAM), 190 MHz StrongARM SA-1100 processor and a QWERTY computer keyboard. The RAM is upgradeable by adding an extra 32 MB chip. The netBook is powered by a removable rechargeable lithium-ion battery, giving a battery life of 8 to 10 hours.

The netBook runs the EPOC ER5 operating system, the predecessor of Symbian OS. Unlike the Psion Series 7, the netBook operating system runs from RAM. A Java virtual machine runtime system (environment), conforming to Java version 1.1.8, is available.

In October 2003, Psion Teklogix announced the NetBook Pro, replacing the original netBook. This was similar to the earlier model, but upgraded with a 16-bit colour Super VGA (SVGA, 800 × 600 pixel) display, 128 MB of RAM, and a 400 MHz Intel XScale PXA255 processor running Windows CE .NET Framework 4.2 instead of EPOC. It is also possible to run Linux on this model.

An open-source project OpenPsion, formerly PsiLinux, ported Linux to the Psion netBook and other Psion PDAs.

Included software 
 Agenda – a personal information management program
 Bombs – a minesweeper game
 Calc – a calculator
 Comms – a terminal emulator
 Contacts – a contacts manager
 Data – a flat-file database program
 Email – an email, SMS and fax client
 Jotter – a multipage scratchpad
 NetStatRF – a Wi-Fi card monitor
 Program – an Open Programming Language (OPL) editor
 Record – a voice recording program, for use with the in-built microphone
 Sheet – a spreadsheet and graphing package
 Sketch – a drawing program (for use with the touch-screen interface)
 Spell – a spellchecker, thesaurus and anagram program
 Time – a world clock and alarm program
 Opera – a web browser
 Word – a word processor

The Netbook trademark 
They used this trademark for the netBook product, discontinued in November 2003, and from October 2003, the NETBOOK PRO, later also discontinued.

Intel began use of the term netbook in March 2008 as a generic term to describe "small laptops that are designed for wireless communication and access to the Internet", believing they were "not offering a branded line of computers here" and "see no naming conflict".

In response to the growing use of this term, on 23 December 2008, Psion Teklogix sent cease and desist letters to various parties including enthusiast website(s) demanding they no longer use the term "netbook".

During the twelve years since Psion first lodged the original netbook trademark, the term had become perceived as sufficiently generic that later derivative marks were rejected by the USPTO citing a "likelihood of confusion" under section 2(d), including "G NETBOOK" ( rejected 31 October 2008), MSI's "WIND NETBOOK" and Coby Electronics' "COBY NETBOOK" ( rejected 13 January 2009).

References

External links 
 Psion Teklogix website
 Psion Teklogix – EOL products

Psion laptops
Personal digital assistants
Personal information managers
Computer-related introductions in 1999